John Fryall Snodgrass (March 2, 1804 – June 5, 1854) was a U.S. Representative from Virginia.

Biography
Snodgrass was born in Berkeley County, Virginia (now West Virginia) to William Snodgrass and Ann Fryatt Snodgrass. He completed preparatory studies, studied law and was admitted to the bar in 1843. He began the practice of law in Parkersburg, Virginia. Snodgrass served as delegate to the Virginia Constitutional Convention of 1850.

Snodgrass was elected as a Democrat to the Thirty-third Congress and served from March 4, 1853, until his death in Parkersburg (now West Virginia) on June 5, 1854.

Personal life
Snodgrass was married to Louisa Kinnaird Snodgrass and they had three children, John William Snodgrass, Kinnaird Snodgrass and Mary Louisa Snodgrass Murphy. After Louisa's death, he married Virginia Quarrier and they had one child Sarah Virginia Snodgrass.

Death and legacy
He is interred in Riverview Cemetery in Parkersburg. There is a cenotaph in his honor in the Congressional Cemetery in Washington, D.C.

See also
List of United States Congress members who died in office (1790–1899)

References

External links

 The Political Graveyard
 

1804 births
1854 deaths
Politicians from Parkersburg, West Virginia
Virginia lawyers
Democratic Party members of the United States House of Representatives from Virginia
People from Berkeley County, West Virginia
19th-century American politicians
19th-century American lawyers
People of pre-statehood West Virginia